William Palmer (born 15 February 1997) is a British former racing driver. He is the son of Jonathan Palmer and brother of Jolyon Palmer. He is a past winner of the McLaren Autosport BRDC Award.

He won the BRDC F4 Championship in 2015 having previously won the 2014 BRDC Formula 4 Winter Championship.

Career

Ginetta Juniors (2011-2013)
A successful 2013 season saw Palmer finish third in the 2013 Ginetta Junior Championship.

BRDC Formula 4 (2013-2015)

Palmer competed in the BRDC Formula 4 Winter Championship in 2013, ahead of graduating to the category for 2014. A promising debut full season in BRDC F4 saw Palmer take two wins and finish sixth in the 2014 overall standings. He followed that up by winning the F4 Winter Championship, taking four wins from eight races. He was nominated for the McLaren Autosport BRDC Award and he was named the winner at the Autosport Awards.

2015 McLaren Autosport BRDC Award

After his record-breaking BRDC F4 season, Palmer was nominated for the 2015 McLaren Autosport BRDC Award alongside Jack Aitken, Ben Barnicoat, Jake Hughes, Ricky Collard and Toby Sowery. After two days of assessments at Silverstone, Palmer was named the winner at the Autosport Awards in London, receiving the prize of £100,000, a McLaren F1 test, Arai Carbon helmet and BRDC membership.

After the end of the 2016 season, Palmer received his McLaren F1 test for winning the 2015 McLaren Autosport BRDC Award, impressing the team throughout with McLaren simulator test engineer Alice Rowlands commenting that Palmer should be "very happy" with his maiden run in a Grand Prix car. "It's not easy," she added, "he doesn't know anyone and it's a step up from anything he's done before, working with this many engineers. Looking at the data it was clearly someone driving a Formula 1 car properly - not someone that was out for a little afternoon drive around."

Formula Renault 2.0 (2016-17)

For 2016, Palmer graduated to race in Europe and competed in both the Eurocup Formula Renault 2.0 championship and Formula Renault 2.0 Northern European Cup for the R-ace GP team. He scored five podium finishes over the course of the season and claimed his maiden victory in European racing as he took the chequered flag in the penultimate race of the Eurocup season at Estoril in Portugal.

In December 2016, it was announced that Palmer would continue with R-ace GP for the 2017 championships. He finished as runner-up to Sacha Fenestraz with wins at Silverstone, Monza and Monaco and another seven podiums.

GP3 Series
In April 2018, Palmer signed with MP Motorsport for the final season of the sport. He only made one round as he retired from racing in June 2018 to focus on his studies and his work.

Racing record

Career summary

† As Palmer was a guest driver, he was ineligible for points.

Complete GP3 Series results
(key) (Races in bold indicate pole position) (Races in italics indicate fastest lap)

References

External links
 
 

1997 births
Living people
People from Horsham
English racing drivers
Formula Renault Eurocup drivers
Formula Renault 2.0 NEC drivers
BRDC British Formula 3 Championship drivers
GP3 Series drivers
Ginetta Junior Championship drivers
MP Motorsport drivers
R-ace GP drivers
ART Grand Prix drivers